Carphephorus corymbosus, the Florida paintbrush or coastal plain chaffhead, is a species of North American plants in the family Asteraceae. They are native to the southeastern United States in the States of Florida, Georgia, and South Carolina.

Description
Carphephorus corymbosus is an herb up to 120 cm (4 feet) tall. It produces a flat-topped inflorescence with many small purplish flower heads containing disc florets but no ray florets.

References

External links
Florida Native Plant Society
Native Florida Wildflowers
Lady Bird Johnson Wildflower Center, University of Texas

Eupatorieae
Plants described in 1818
Flora of the Southeastern United States
Flora without expected TNC conservation status